The BNXT League Dream Team is an annual BNXT League honor bestowed on the best players in the league following every season.

Teams
The player in bold was named the BNXT League Most Valuable Player of the given season.

References

External links
BNXT League - Official Site
BNXT League - Official Award Page
BNXT League at Eurobasket.com

European basketball awards
BNXT League basketball awards